Padarvand may refer to:

Padarvand-e Olya
Padarvand-e Sofla
Padarvand-e Vosta